Didaskalia is an annual peer-reviewed academic journal of theology published by Providence College and Theological Seminary.

It is abstracted and indexed in Religious and Theological Abstracts, ATLA Religion Database, and ATLASerials Online.

External links 
 

Protestant studies journals
Publications established in 1989
English-language journals
Annual journals
Academic journals published in Canada
Magazines published in Manitoba